Hedysarum spinosissimum is a species of annual herb in the family Fabaceae. They have a self-supporting growth form and compound, broad leaves. Individuals can grow to 22 cm tall.

Sources

References 

Hedysareae
Flora of Malta